Theophilus Harrison was an Anglican priest in Ireland during the late 17th and early 18th centuries.

Harrison was educated at Trinity College, Dublin. He was appointed the incumbent of St John, Dublin in 1696; a prebendary of Christ Church Cathedral, Dublin in 1696; Dean of Clonmacnoise in 1697; and a prebendary of St Patrick's Cathedral, Dublin in 1702. He died in 1720.

References

Alumni of Trinity College Dublin
Deans of Clonmacnoise
17th-century Irish Anglican priests
18th-century Irish Anglican priests
1720 deaths
Year of birth missing